The 1948–49 Toronto Maple Leafs season involved winning the Stanley Cup. The Maple Leafs became the first team in NHL history to win three consecutive Stanley Cups.

Offseason

Regular season

Final standings

Record vs. opponents

Schedule and results

Player statistics

Regular season
Scoring

Goaltending

Playoffs
Scoring

Goaltending

Playoffs

Semifinals

Toronto Maple Leafs vs. Boston Bruins

Toronto won best-of-seven series 4 games to 1

Stanley Cup Finals
Detroit Red Wings vs. Toronto Maple Leafs

Toronto won best-of-seven series 4–0.

Transactions
 April 20, 1948: Acquired Eldie Kobussen from the Springfield Indians of the AHL for Gordie Bell, Armand Lemieux, Leo Curick and Rod Roy
 April 26, 1948: Acquired Cal Gardner, Bill Juzda, Rene Trudell and Frank Mathers from the New York Rangers for Wally Stanowski and Elwyn Morris
 July 27, 1948: Acquired Danny Lewicki from the Providence Reds of the AHL for Future Considerations
 October 27, 1948: Traded Jack Hamilton and cash to the Providence Reds of the AHL to complete a previous transaction

References

External links
 Toronto Maple Leafs 1948–49 roster and statistics on Hockey Database
 Toronto Maple Leafs 1948–49 Game Log and Scores on Database Hockey

Stanley Cup championship seasons
Toronto Maple Leafs seasons
Toronto
Tor